John Harcourt Nevinson (2 November 1910 – 22 August 1987) was an English first-class cricketer who played for Middlesex and Oxford University between 1930 and 1935. He was born in Lausanne, Switzerland and died in Lambeth, London.

References

1910 births
1987 deaths
English cricketers
Middlesex cricketers
Oxford University cricketers
Alumni of Christ Church, Oxford
Free Foresters cricketers
Sportspeople from Lausanne